The Mercury laser is a high-average-power laser system developed at Lawrence Livermore National Laboratory as a prototype for systems to drive inertial confinement fusion.  Like the National Ignition Facility, it is intended to produce narrow pulses of extremely high power, using diode-pumped solid-state lasers.  Unlike the NIF system, the Mercury laser aims to achieve a high repetition rate: its goals are 10 pulses per second, each delivering 100 J with a 10% efficient conversion of electricity to laser light.

The active gain medium is Yb:SFAP (Ytterbium-doped Sr5(PO4)3), which is cooled by fast-flowing helium to allow high repetition rates.  Infrared light at 900 nm from 8 arrays of laser diodes pumps the laser.

See also
 Mercury-vapor lamp, a gas discharge lamp that uses the element mercury in an excited state to produce light

References 
 

Inertial confinement fusion research lasers